Coon Creek is a stream in northwest Pulaski County and northeast Camden County in the U.S. state of Missouri. It is a tributary of Deane Creek.

The stream headwaters arise just south of the community of Hawkeye in the northwest corner of Pulaski County (at ).

Coon Creek was named for the raccoons observed along its course.

See also
List of rivers of Missouri

References

Rivers of Camden County, Missouri
Rivers of Pulaski County, Missouri
Rivers of Missouri